Filenskoye is a rural locality (a village) in Nikolskoye Rural Settlement, Ust-Kubinsky District, Vologda Oblast, Russia. The population was 24 as of 2002.

Geography 
Filenskoye is located 33 km northwest of Ustye (the district's administrative centre) by road. Nikolskoye is the nearest rural locality.

References 

Rural localities in Ust-Kubinsky District